Tin(IV) sulfide is a compound with the formula . The compound crystallizes in the cadmium iodide motif, with the Sn(IV) situated in "octahedral holes' defined by six sulfide centers. It occurs naturally as the rare mineral berndtite. It is useful as semiconductor material with band gap 2.2 eV.

Reactions
This reaction is reversed at low pH. Crystalline  has a bronze color and is used in decorative coating where it is known as mosaic gold.

The material also reacts with sulfide salts to give a series of thiostannates with the formula .  A simplified equation for this depolymerization reaction is
 +  → .

References

External links

Sulfides
Tin(IV) compounds
IV-VI semiconductors
Dichalcogenides